Morgan Cole Wallen (born May 13, 1993) is an American country music singer and songwriter. He competed in the sixth season of The Voice, originally as a member of Usher's team, but later as a member of Adam Levine's team. After being eliminated in the playoffs of that season, he signed to Panacea Records, releasing his debut EP, Stand Alone, in 2015.

In 2016, Wallen signed to Big Loud, releasing his debut album, If I Know Me, in 2018. The album includes the singles "Up Down" (featuring Florida Georgia Line), "Whiskey Glasses", and "Chasin' You". If I Know Me reached No. 1 on the Billboard Top Country Albums chart. Wallen's second album, Dangerous: The Double Album, was released in January 2021, and in February 2021 became the only country album in the 64-year history of the Billboard 200 to spend its first seven weeks at No. 1. It spent a total of ten weeks at that spot, the first album to do so since Whitney Houston's Whitney in 1987. The album included Billboard No. 1 singles "More Than My Hometown", "7 Summers", and "Wasted on You".

Wallen was arrested for disorderly conduct after being ejected from Kid Rock's steakhouse in Nashville in May 2020, and was suspended from a scheduled Saturday Night Live performance that October after video evidence surfaced that showed Wallen was not adhering to NBC's COVID-19 protocols. In February 2021, a video was released that captured Wallen having said the racial epithet nigger. The incident resulted in temporary suspension from his record label and removal of his music from several major radio networks in the United States. Despite the controversy, Wallen's music experienced a surge in commercial success following the incident.

Early life, family and education
Morgan Wallen was born to Tommy and Lesli Wallen on May 13, 1993, in Sneedville, Tennessee. Tommy served for a time as a local church pastor, while Lesli worked as a teacher. In his teens, the family relocated south to Knoxville, where he graduated from Gibbs High School. He was a pitcher and shortstop for the school's baseball team, and hoped to continue in college, but tore his ulnar collateral ligament his senior year.

As a child, Wallen took piano and violin lessons. He was raised on a diverse musical playlist, with his father exposing him to classic rock mainstays. In his teens, he gravitated towards bands like Breaking Benjamin and Nickelback, as well as rappers like Lil Wayne. 

Wallen has characterized his early adulthood as adrift; he worked in landscaping after high school and was disappointed by his inability to continue his baseball career. He re-approached his interest in music and began learning guitar. He had grown to love country music, especially artists like Keith Whitley and Eric Church, and he modeled his sound after that lineage.

Career

Early career and The Voice (2014–2017)
In 2014, Wallen competed on season six of the music competition program The Voice. He auditioned with the song "Collide" by Howie Day. Judges Shakira and Usher complimented his stylings, and Wallen joined Usher's team. He was later taken by Adam Levine's team after his second round, and later eliminated during the playoffs. Wallen was disappointed by the setback, but doubled down on his ambition: "Some things in life are out of your control. Being the best you can be isn't. I didn't feel like I was the best I could have been. So I practiced harder." Still, The Voice was instrumental in raising Wallen's profile, and he began to establish connections in the music industry.

While in California to appear on The Voice, Wallen began working with Sergio Sanchez of Atom Smash, a vocal coach on the program. Wallen relocated to Nashville to further his career, and he and Sanchez started a temporary band: Morgan Wallen & Them Shadows. Sanchez introduced Wallen to Bill Ray and Paul Trust of Panacea Records. In 2015, Wallen signed to Panacea Records where he was joined by Dominic Frost on guitar and released an EP Stand Alone on August 24, 2015. "Spin You Around" was Wallen's debut single under Panacea Records; it was later certified gold by the Recording Industry Association of America (RIAA) in 2021.

In 2015, Wallen's manager, Dirk Hemsath of Working Group Artist Management, sent a demo of Wallen to Big Loud Shirt's Seth England, who had Wallen audition for his partners in Big Loud Records. They signed Wallen to the label and the publishing company, who began pairing his songs with other artists. That year, he released his debut single "The Way I Talk"; his first music video for the song followed in 2017. Wallen co-wrote the A Thousand Horses's single "Preachin' to the Choir", Dallas Smith's "The Fall", as well as Jason Aldean's "You Make It Easy" with Florida Georgia Line's Tyler Hubbard, Brian Kelley, and Jordan Schmidt. He joined Florida Georgia Line on their Dig Your Roots Tour. He collaborated with the group on the single "Up Down", his first song to reach the top five of Billboard Hot Country Songs chart.

Mainstream success (2018–present)

At the outset of his career, Wallen underwent a personal stylistic shift, adopting a distinctive mullet and a look that Kelefa Sanneh, profiling Wallen's rise in a piece for The New Yorker, described as "Everyman rock star [...] not just a singer but a character." Wallen had decided to adopt the retro hairdo after seeing a younger photo of his father with the cut. Wallen's debut studio album, If I Know Me, saw release on April 27, 2018, with its third single, "Whiskey Glasses", becoming his biggest success yet. The song reached the top spot on both the Hot Country Songs and Country Airplay charts; it also marked his top 40 appearance on the all-genre Hot 100 ranking, where it placed at number 17. It was Billboard 2019 top Hot Country song and Top Country Airplay song. Sanneh characterized "Whiskey Glasses" as his signature song and a "perfectly constructed ode to a woman and a drink, lost and found, respectively." In 2019, Wallen joined Florida Georgia Line on their Can't Say I Ain't Country Tour. His next single, "Chasin' You", was serviced to radio in July 2019 and peaked at number two on the Hot Country Songs chart; like its predecessor, it captured the top spot on the overall year-end tally for 2020. In August 2020, If I Know Me reached No. 1 on the Top Country Albums chart after a record-breaking 114 weeks.

Wallen's profile continued to rise, with a growing following on platforms like TikTok, and he developed into an unwitting sex symbol. Wallen appeared on the cover of Billboard, whose headline read: "Is Morgan Wallen Country's Next Global Star?" At the start of the COVID-19 pandemic, Wallen found himself with more time to write and record material, which developed into his sophomore album, the double-disc Dangerous: The Double Album (2021),  which showcases a mix of country and R&B/pop balladry. Dangerous was an immediate blockbuster: it debuted atop the US Billboard 200 and the Canadian Albums Chart,; it would remain atop the Canadian chart for four consecutive weeks, and the US chart for six consecutive weeks, marking the first new album from a country artist to do that since Garth Brooks' The Chase in 1992. Its singles—"More Than My Hometown", "7 Summers", "Sand in My Boots" and "Wasted on You"—were record-breaking hit songs that pushed Wallen farther into the national conversation. "7 Summers" earned him his first top 10 on the Hot 100, debuting and peaking at number six, and was also chosen by Time as one of the best songs of the year. Wallen soon became the first artist to ever chart six songs within the top 10 of Hot Country Songs chart at the same time in the week after his album's release; likewise, the album charted 23 tracks on the Canadian Hot 100, and 19 tracks on the Hot 100 in the U.S.

Though his public image took a hit with his controversies—especially his use of a racial slur, detailed below—Wallen remained very popular. In the week following the controversy, album sales of Dangerous surged.  In some cases, the physical as well as digital album sales went up over 100% in the week following the controversy. He remained atop the Billboard charts for seven more weeks; If I Know Me even entered the top 10 for the first time. Over the ensuing years, Dangerous remained a juggernaut; Ben Sisario, writing in The New York Times, dubbed it "an unusually enduring hit". It has continued to break chart records: it was the best-performing album of 2021, and in 2022, the album broke the record for the most weeks in the top 10 on the Billboard 200 chart among albums by a singular artist, surpassing a goal set a half-century before. Dangerous was awarded Album of the Year at the Academy of Country Music; Wallen also won Favorite Male Artist and Favorite Album at the inaugural Country Now Awards.

Wallen has continued to release new music, and has remained a popular draw on the road. The Dangerous Tour of arenas and amphitheaters was completely sold-out. His single "You Proof" became his second Hot 100 hit and first to reach the top five; both "You Proof" and "Thought You Should Know" topped the country charts. Wallen also collaborated with rapper Lil Durk on the song "Broadway Girls", a top-15 hit on the Hot 100; he also performed the song live with Durk at MLK Freedom Fest in Nashville. Wallen was a co-writer on the Tyler Joe Miller single "Wild as Her", released in February 2022, and the Keith Urban single "Brown Eyes Baby, released in July 2022. In December 2022, Wallen released a sampler EP titled One Thing at a Time, featuring three songs he had been working on up until this point, titled "One Thing at a Time", "Tennessee Fan" and "Days That End in Why". In 2023, Wallen will expand to stadiums with his One Night At A Time World Tour. Wallen released his third studio album One Thing at a Time on March 3, 2023.

Personal life
Wallen and ex-girlfriend KT Smith have a son together who was born in July 2020.

Arrest for intoxication
In May 2020, Wallen was arrested outside Kid Rock's bar in downtown Nashville for public intoxication and disorderly conduct. He apologized on social media for his charges.

Use of racial slur
On February 2, 2021, TMZ released a video recorded on January 31 showing Wallen using the racial epithet "nigger" with friends as they were entering his Nashville home. He issued a statement apologizing for using the racial slur. As a result of the incident, SiriusXM Satellite Radio, iHeartRadio, Entercom (now Audacy, Inc.), Cumulus, and Townsquare temporarily removed Wallen's music from airplay on their stations. Wallen's songs and promotional photographs were also removed from Apple Music, Pandora and Spotify featured playlists, though Spotify later re-added Wallen's music back to their playlists one week later. CMT and the Country Music Association removed Wallen's appearances from their platforms, and Wallen's record label Big Loud (and partner Republic Records) suspended its recording contract with him indefinitely. On February 3, 2021, the Academy of Country Music announced that Wallen and his latest album Dangerous: The Double Album would be ineligible for the 56th Annual Academy of Country Music Awards. On February 10, 2021, Wallen shot an apology video in which he asked his fans not to defend him. That same day, Jason Isbell, the original singer of "Cover Me Up" announced that he would be donating all of the royalties from Wallen's cover to the NAACP. Despite the controversy and ensuing backlash, Wallen's music remained popular, with his album sales in fact surging after the incident, eventually becoming 2021's best-selling album. 

In April 2021, following the surge in album sales, Wallen donated $300,000 to the Black Music Action Coalition in the names of 20 people who had counseled him following the incident. Those individuals were given the option to funnel their respective $15,000 donations to a charity of their choice, or keep the money within the BMAC. On July 23, 2021, Wallen publicly spoke of his comments on Good Morning America, where he said that "he was around some of his friends, and they say dumb stuff together" and said that "he was wrong" to express those words. Wallen's songs returned to country radio in August 2021 when his single "Sand in My Boots" was released. Wallen was nominated for Favorite Male Country Artist and Favorite Country Album for the 2021 American Music Awards, but was not invited to attend the ceremony, and was consequently unable to accept any awards if he won, which he did not. In response to Wallen's use of a racial slur, in April 2021 writer Holly G. founded the Black Opry, a website and touring revue dedicated to Black country music artists.

Discography

If I Know Me (2018)
Dangerous: The Double Album (2021)
One Thing at a Time (2023)

Tours
Headlining
The Dangerous Tour (2022)
One Night at a Time World Tour (2023) (with Bailey Zimmerman, ERNEST, Hardy, and Parker McCollum)

Opening
What Makes You Country Tour (2018) (with Luke Bryan)
Beer Never Broke My Heart Tour (2019) with Luke Combs

Awards and nominations

References

External links

1993 births
21st-century American male singers
21st-century American singers
American country singer-songwriters
American male singer-songwriters
Big Loud artists
Country musicians from Tennessee
Living people
People from Hancock County, Tennessee
The Voice (franchise) contestants
Singer-songwriters from Tennessee
Race-related controversies in music